An election was held on November 4, 2014 to elect 10 of the 21 members to Delaware's Senate. The election coincided with the elections for other offices, including the U.S. Senate, U.S. House of Representatives, and State House. The primary election was held on September 9, 2014.

Delaware Republicans needed to have a net gain of 3 seats to flip the chamber from the Democrats, however, they gained only 1 seat (winning 9 seats compared to 12 seats for the Democrats).

Results Summary

Detailed results

District 2
Incumbent Democrat Majority Leader Margaret Rose Henry has represented the 2nd district since 1994.

District 3
Incumbent Democrat Robert Marshall has represented the 3rd district since 1979.

District 4
Incumbent Republican Gregory Lavelle has represented the 4th district since 2013.

District 6
Incumbent Republican Ernesto Lopez has represented the 6th district since 2013.

District 10
Incumbent Democrat Bethany Hall-Long has represented the 10th district since 2009.

District 11
Incumbent Democrat Bryan Townsend has represented the 11th district since 2013.

District 16
Incumbent Republican Colin Bonini has represented the 16th district since 1995.

District 17
Incumbent Democrat Brian Bushweller has represented the 17th district since 2009.

District 18
Incumbent Republican Minority Leader Gary Simpson has represented the 18th district since 1999.

District 21
Incumbent Democrat Robert Venables Sr. has represented the 21st district since 1989. He lost re-election to Republican Bryant Richardson.

References

Delaware Senate
State Senate
2014